Loránd Rudolf Lohinszky (25 July 1924 – 22 June 2013) was a Romanian Merited Artist and university professor of Hungarian ethnicity.

Personal life 
Lohinszky was born in Cluj. From 1954 until his death, he was professor of the University of Arts from Targu Mures. In 1957 he married actress Farkas Ibolya. Their child, Lohinszky Júlia, was born in 1958.

He died on 22 June 2013 in Târgu Mureş, after a short illness. The burial took place on 26 June 2013 in the reformed church's graveyard, in Targu Mures.

Awards, prizes

 Merited artist of Romania (1964)
 The Award of the "Magyar Művészetért Alapítvány" (1995) 
 The "Magyar Köztársasági Érdemrend tisztikeresztje" (1995)
 Order of the Star of Romania, Officer rank (2000) 
 Uniter  Lifetime Achievement Award (2000) 
 Honorary Doctor of the National Theater and Film Academy, in Bucharest (2005)

Principal roles played in theatre 
 Szép Ernő: Lila ákác
 Ion Luca Caragiale: O scrisoare pierdută
 Romulus Guga: Egy öngyilkos világa – Ignatiu
 Kovács Levente: Az emlékek kávéháza
 George Bernard Shaw: Mrs. Warren's Profession – Praed
 Mihail Bulgakov: A divatszalon titka
 Jean Racine: Phèdre – Thésée
 Aleksei Arbuzov: Régimódi komédia
 Kovács Levente: Mi van a padláson
 Maxim Gorky: The Lower Depths – Luka
 Székely János: Irgalmas hazugság – Dr. Bálint Ákos
 William Somerset Maugham: Színház – Michael Gosselyn
 Kincses Elemér: Maraton – Első koldus
 Sütő András: Az álomkommandó – Manó
 Vaszary Gábor: Az ördög nem alszik – Gróf Boroghy Gedeon
 William Shakespeare: Romeo and Juliet – Lőrinc
 Edward Albee: Who's Afraid of Virginia Woolf? – George
 Friedrich Dürrenmatt: The Visit – Ill
 Bornemisza Péter: Magyar Elektra – Mester
 Békés Pál: New Buda – Pulszky Ferenc
 Anton Chekhov: The Seagull – Trepljov
 Heltai Jenő: A néma levente – Beppo
 Anton Chekhov: Three Sisters (play) – Kuligin
 Gyula Illyés: Fáklyaláng – Görgey
 Carlo Goldoni: Különös történet – Filiberto
 William Shakespeare: King Lear – King Lear
 József Katona: Bánk bán – Biberach
 Sütő András: Vidám sirató egy bolyongó porszemért – Prédikás
 Nagy István: Özönvíz előtt – Darkó
 Anton Chekhov: Platonov (play) – Platonov
 Sütő András: Csillag a máglyán – Kálvin; Szervét
 Németh László: A két Bolyai – Bolyai Farkas
 István Örkény: Tóték (The Tóth Family) – Őrnagy
 Friedrich Schiller: Don Carlos (play) – II. Fülöp
 Krúdy Gyula – Kapás Dezső: A vörös postakocsi – Alvinczy Eduárd
 Imre Madách: The Tragedy of Man – Lucifer

Filmography 
 Egy hétköznapi történet (1957)
 Nincs idő (1973)
 Holnap lesz fácán (1974)
 Álmodó ifjúság (1974)
 A szegények kapitánya (1976)
 Apám néhány boldog éve (1977)
 Naplemente délben (1979)
 Kereszt és láng (1979)
 Ítélet után (1979)
 Naplemente délben (1980)
 Anna (1981)
 Vörös vurstli (1991)
 A három nővér (1991)
 Köd (1994)
 Ábel a rengetegben (1994)
 Csendélet (1994)
 New Buda (1995)
 Retúr (1996)
 A nagy fejedelem (1997)
 In memoriam Mándy Iván (1998)
 Színészfejedelem (1998)
 Pejkó (2003)

Resources 
 Imdb, https://www.imdb.com/name/nm0517838/

References

1924 births
2013 deaths
Actors from Cluj-Napoca
Romanian male stage actors
Romanian people of Hungarian descent
Romanian male film actors